Shabbona Township is one of nineteen townships in DeKalb County, Illinois, USA. As of the 2010 census, its population was 1,453 and it contained 603 housing units. The township contains the Chief Shabbona Forest Preserve and Shabbona Lake State Park.

Geography
The township is named after the Potawatomi tribal leader, Chief Shabbona.

Cities, towns, villages
 Lee (partial)
 Shabbona

Unincorporated towns
 Shabbona Grove at 
(This list is based on USGS data and may include former settlements.)

Cemeteries
 Old English
 Smith
 Lee Calvary
 Rose Hill

Demographics

School districts
 Indian Creek Community Unit District 425

Political districts
 Illinois's 14th congressional district
 State House District 70
 State Senate District 35

References
 
 US Census Bureau 2009 TIGER/Line Shapefiles
 US National Atlas

External links
 City-Data.com
 Illinois State Archives
 Township Officials of Illinois
 DeKalb County Official Site

Townships in DeKalb County, Illinois
1849 establishments in Illinois
Townships in Illinois